B'nai Reuben Anshe Sfard (בית הכנסת הגדול דחברה בני ראובן אנשי ספרד) was a synagogue located in the Queen Village neighborhood of Center City Philadelphia. The congregation was founded in 1883. In 1904, the congregation constructed a synagogue at 615 S 6th Street near South Street in the city's Jewish quarter. The congregation vacated the synagogue building in 1956. The synagogue building was home to the Antiquarian's Delight antique market from 1985 to 2013. The building was renovated and converted to condominiums in 2015.

Synagogue History, 1905-1956
The congregation was established in 1883 and chartered in 1888 by Reuben Kanefsky. It is considered the city's first Haddishe synagogue. Congregants met at member homes at 730 E Passyunk Avenue and 240 Monroe Street.

Founded by Reuben Manebsky. Met at member homes - 730 Passyunk Ave & 240 Monroe St - until use of own synagogue at 620 Minister St in 1888. This building was sold in the 90's to Anshe Zitomer. New Synagogue built at 6th & Kater built in 1904.  Roman Baroque & East European elements. Subsequently, The Antiquarian Delight, an indoor antiques market.
[1901 lists a Barditchiefner [Berditchev] Verein. Members from Berditch, Pizhin and Tolener.]

In 1888, B'nai Reuben purchased the Union Baptist Church's 500 seat building at 620 Addison Street (formerly Minster Street). By 1900, B'nai Reuben had 150 members and 200 seatholders, and offered daily, Sabbath, and holy day services.

In 1905, B'nai Reuben sold their 620 Addison Street property, Union Baptist Church's first home, to the City of Philadelphia for $10,000. The city demolished the church and created a schoolyard for the adjacent public school, James Forten Elementary Manual Training School.

The American Architect and Building News in 1900 reported that the congregation had “purchased the houses at 928, 930, and 932 S. 6th St. and will erect a commodious synagogue on the site.” The congregation would not erect its new building at this site and instead laid a cornerstone at 615 S 6th Street at Kater Street in 1904. The shul was home to the Tolner Rebbe in 1910s. Philadelphia's hasidim, according to M. Freeman, were generally followers of the Berditchev and Pizhiner Rebbes.

The congregation occupied the building until 1956. Many of the synagogue's memorial plaques were transferred to the Vilna Congregation.

Antiquarian's Delight
Antiquarian's Delight operated on the ground floor and basement of the synagogue beginning in 1985. The upper sanctuary was closed to the public and became a storehouse. The second floor windows rotted and broke, and became open to the elements and animals. Merchandise became covered with years of pigeon guano, and dead and decaying pigeons.

In July 2013, the Antiquarian's Delight closed. The building property was sold to the Fetfafzes family, owners of area businesses in November 2012 for $1.1 million.

Residences
The Farfetzes converted the building into 13 apartments. Philadelphia's Department of Licenses and Inspections issued an alteration permit in November 2013. The building has a leasing office on the ground floor, storage space for the tenants in the basement, and a penthouse for mechanical equipment.

References

External links 
Google Maps/615 S 6th Street

Synagogues completed in 1905
Ashkenazi Jewish culture in Philadelphia
Ashkenazi synagogues
Synagogues in Philadelphia
Former synagogues in the United States
1883 establishments in Pennsylvania